Kotara High School is a government-funded co-educational comprehensive secondary day school, located in Adamstown Heights, a suburb of Newcastle, New South Wales, Australia.

Established in 1968, the school enrolled approximately 1,070 students in 2018, from Year 7 to Year 12, of whom three percent identified as Indigenous Australians and eleven percent were from a language background other than English. The school is operated by the New South Wales Department of Education and its current principal is Mark Sneddon.

Description
Kotara High School has four main buildings, named A, B, C and D "blocks" respectively. Other major buildings include the Administration building (built in 2018) which houses administrative staff as well as the senior leadership team, and the multi-purpose centre used for assemblies, performance, and sporting activities. In the centre of the school is the quadrangle with a COLA structure used for shade at one end. The school also features two basketball/netball courts, a field, and a canteen building equipped with facilities to play net sports as well as change rooms and shower amenities.  The school's colours are green, black, yellow and white.

School organisation
The school is divided in to eight main academic faculties. These are English, Science, Mathematics, Human Society and Its Environment, Technology and Applied Sciences, Personal Development and Health, Support Unit, and the Language, Art and Music faculty. Each faculty is led by a Head Teacher, there is also a Head Teacher of Administration, and a Head Teacher of Teaching & Learning. Until recently, the school had a Social Science faculty and a History faculty, however these have now been merged.

The school is led by the Principal and two Deputy Principals. Student representation is an important aspect of the school's culture. The Student Representative Council (SRC) is the main body through which students are able to have an input in to the leadership of the school. Kotara High's SRC consists of three elected members from each year group from year 8 to year 10, and six elected members from year 11. The SRC is led by its executive year 12 members who consist of one male and one female Captain, one male and one female Vice Captain, and a President.

Curriculum
The school delivers the mandated curriculum developed by the New South Wales Education Standards Authority. Students in the junior school (years 7–10) study the core subjects of English, mathematics, science, history, geography, language, music, visual art, metalwork, woodwork, cooking, textiles, physical education and health.

From year 8, students are able to select a certain number of their subjects based on their personal interests and aspirations. Examples of subject choices include Commerce, Photography, Drama, Multi-media and Film, Conspiracies in History, Law and You, Travel and Tourism, Architectural Design, Japanese Language, French Language, Timber Technology, Engineering, Electronics, Aboriginal Studies, Drama, Life and the Universe, Metal Technology, Child Studies, Marine and Aquaculture Technology, and European Language and Culture.

In the senior school, students work towards a Higher School Certificate, and other vocational qualifications to suit their post-school aspirations.

School events
Highlights of the school calendar include annual swimming, athletics, cross country carnivals and more recently, the "Big Day Out". The Big Day Out is an event in which performing arts students from the school showcase a mini concert.

See also 

 List of government schools in New South Wales
 Education in Australia

References

External links

NSW Schools website

Public high schools in New South Wales
Education in Newcastle, New South Wales
1968 establishments in Australia
Educational institutions established in 1968